Haengsin Station is a station on the Gyeongui-Jungang Line and Gyeongui Line. The KTX Goyang Train Depot is located behind this station, and some KTX trains serve passengers at this station.

Station layout 
Haengsin station has 4 platforms for Gyeongui-Jungang Line and one 2 island platform serving KTX.

Platforms

Gallery

External links
 Station information from Korail

Railway stations in Gyeonggi Province
Seoul Metropolitan Subway stations
Korea Train Express stations
Railway stations opened in 1996
Metro stations in Goyang